The second season of Monk originally aired in the United States on USA Network from June 20, 2003, to March 5, 2004. It consisted of 16 episodes. Tony Shalhoub, Bitty Schram, Ted Levine, and Jason Gray-Stanford reprised their roles as the main characters. A DVD of the season was released on October 11, 2004.

Crew
Andy Breckman continued his tenure as show runner. Executive producers for the season included Breckman and David Hoberman. Universal Network Television was the primary production company backing the show. The instrumental theme (written by Jeff Beal) was replaced by "It's a Jungle Out There" by Randy Newman. The song received a Primetime Emmy Award for Outstanding Main Title Theme Music, making Monk the first show to win the award twice. Directors for the season included Randall Zisk, Jerry Levine, and Michael Zinberg. Writers for the season included David Breckman, Lee Goldberg, William Rabkin, Hy Conrad, Daniel Dratch, Michael Angeli, Tom Scharpling, Joe Toplyn, and Andy Breckman.

Cast

All of the main cast from the first season returned: Tony Shalhoub as Adrian Monk, the "defective detective"; Bitty Schram as Sharona Fleming, Monk's forceful nurse and assistant; Ted Levine as Captain Leland Stottlemeyer of the SFPD; and Jason Gray-Stanford as Lieutenant Randy Disher. The role of Benjy Fleming (Sharona's son) returned to the original actor, Kane Ritchotte, and Stanley Kamel returned as Monk's psychiatrist, Dr. Charles Kroger.

Guest stars for the season included Glenne Headly in two episodes as Karen Stottlemeyer, Leland's wife, and Jarrad Paul as Monk's annoying upstairs neighbor, Kevin Dorfman. John Turturro guest starred as Monk's agoraphobic brother, Ambrose, a role that would later win him an Emmy. Tim Curry took over the role of Dale the Whale, originally handled by Adam Arkin in "Mr. Monk Meets Dale the Whale". The part of Trudy Monk, Monk's deceased wife, was played again by Stellina Rusich, but after a recast Melora Hardin replaced her for the role. Amy Sedaris reprised her role as Gail Fleming, and Sarah Silverman made her debut as Monk's biggest fan, Marci Maven.

Episodes

A (HH) listed next to a viewership number indicates the number of household viewers. These are only used if total viewership numbers were unavailable for that particular episode.

Awards and nominations

Emmy Awards
Outstanding Actor – Comedy Series (Tony Shalhoub, nominated)
Outstanding Casting – Comedy Series (nominated)
Outstanding Guest Actor – Comedy Series (John Turturro for playing "Ambrose Monk" in "Mr. Monk and the Three Pies", won)
Outstanding Main Title Theme Music (Randy Newman for "It's a Jungle Out There", won)

Golden Globe Awards
Best Actor – Musical or Comedy Series (Tony Shalhoub, nominated)
Best Actress – Musical or Comedy Series (Bitty Schram for playing "Sharona Fleming", nominated)
Best Series – Musical or Comedy (nominated)

Screen Actors Guild
Outstanding Actor – Comedy Series (Tony Shalhoub for playing "Adrian Monk", won)

References

Monk (TV series)
2003 American television seasons
2004 American television seasons
Monk (TV series) seasons